The president of Marche serves as the head of government of the Italian region of Marche. The current president is Francesco Acquaroli of Brothers of Italy, who has held the office since September 2020.

List of presidents of Marche

 
Politics of le Marche
Marche